Verité Research is an independent interdisciplinary think tank providing strategic analysis and advice for governments and the private sector in Asia. Its main research divisions are economics, politics, law, and media.

Based in Colombo, Sri Lanka its clients include multinational firms, multilateral agencies, diplomatic missions, government agencies, and civil society actors.

It was founded in 2010 by its Executive Director, Dr. Nishan de Mel, a former senior Sri Lankan policy maker.

References

Research institutes in Sri Lanka
Think tanks based in Sri Lanka